Marius Moga is a Romanian singer, songwriter, producer and television personality. He writes and produces music in various styles and genres, especially pop, R&B and club music. In 2011, he became the judge and mentor of the reality singing show Vocea României.

In 2003 the artist was chosen by Walt Disney Pictures Romania to sing the main theme from the series Chip 'n Dale: Rescue Rangers.

Personal life
Moga began dating Romanian actress Iulia Vântur in 2007, however the two ended their relationship in February 2009. The couple rekindled their romance later that year but broke up again in 2011. In December 2013, Moga started a relationship with Pro TV news reporter Bianca Lăpuște. The two announced their engagement in November 2014 at Vocea României and were married on 25 June 2015. On 14 October 2015, the couple welcomed their first child, a daughter. As of February 2020, Moga resides with his wife and daughter in Cernica.

Discography

As lead artist

As featured artist

Guest appearances

Songwriting credits

Awards and nominations

Notes

References

External links 

Marius Moga at Discogs.com
Marius Moga at Allmusic.com

Romanian record producers
Living people
1981 births
21st-century Romanian male singers
21st-century Romanian singers
People from Alba Iulia
Romanian singer-songwriters
Male singer-songwriters